The Nokia 600 was an announced but unreleased touchscreen-based smartphone developed by Nokia. It was announced in August 2011 as one of three launch devices for the Symbian Belle operating system. The Nokia 600 was designed as a music-centric phone and would have been equipped with a 106-phon loudspeaker, which Nokia claimed was the loudest it had ever installed in a product.

It would have been available in Black, White, Pink or Lime. However, the phone was cancelled by Nokia in November 2011.

Features
The device would have featured a 3.2" nHD (640x360 px) display and 5 megapixel camera with flash, 720p video recording and 2x digital zoom. It would have offered 2GB of memory, expandable to 32GB via microSD card, and a 1GHz processor. 

It would also have featured HSPA (3.5G) network connectivity alongside Bluetooth 3.0, GPS, and NFC.

Music and radio
The device was designed primarily for music. The included loudspeaker, according to Nokia, would have made the 600 the 'loudest' phone it had ever produced. The 600 was also to have included FM radio functionality with a built-in antenna, meaning that a set of wired headphones would not have been required for the FM radio to function.

Software
The Nokia 600 would have been one of three launch devices for the 'Belle' update of Nokia's Symbian operating system, which would prove to be the final update for the platform before Nokia switched to Microsoft's Windows Phone software.

References

External links
 Mobiles.sulekha.com
 Froarena.com

Mobile phones introduced in 2011
600
Symbian devices